Yeng Versions Live is a debut live album by Filipino singer Yeng Constantino, released in the Philippines on August 5, 2011, by Star Music. The album consists of OPM Hits from the 1980s and 1990s.

Background
The songs were recorded live in Teatrino Promenade, Greenhills. All of the tracks are OPM renditions, she picked the closest to her heart and her favorite songs. Eraserheads, APO Hiking Society and Rey Valera are her inspirations of recording the live album and she wants to pay tribute to them.

Single
"Paniwalaan Mo" is the only single in the album. It was composed by Chito Ilacad.

Track listing

Certification

Release history

References

Yeng Constantino albums
2011 live albums